The Remembrancer is one of the City of London Corporation’s Chief Officers; the role dates back to 1571. His traditional role is as the channel of communications between the Lord Mayor and the City of London on the one hand and the Sovereign, Royal Household and Parliament on the other. The Remembrancer is also the city's Ceremonial Officer and Chief of Protocol.

Since 2003, the Remembrancer has been Paul Double. He joined the City of London from the Bar and earlier government service. His work in Parliament has centred on the legislation to implement the changes to the city's electoral system.

Origins
On 6 February 1571 the Corporation of the City of London created the office of Remembrancer, appointing Thomas Norton to the position. The record of the decision reads:

The title 'remembrancer' was used for the office as it was responsible for keeping in remembrance the important affairs of the corporation – to act as the corporation's memory.

Remembrancer's role and department
The Remembrancer's department at the City of London is broken into three distinct branches of work: parliamentary, ceremonial and private events. The parliamentary office is responsible for looking after the City of London's interests in Parliament with regard to all public legislation, and the ceremonial office's objectives are to enable the Lord Mayor and City of London to welcome high-profile visitors both domestically and internationally. Functions staged range from small receptions to major state dinners. Finally, the private events team co-ordinate the hiring of Guildhall for private banquets, receptions or conferences. The Remembrancer's department had a budget of £6 million in 2011, and employed six lawyers to scrutinise prospective legislation and give evidence to select committees.

Relationship with Parliament
The Remembrancer is a parliamentary agent and so can observe House of Commons proceedings from the under-gallery next to the entrance to the chamber reserved for visitors, near the chair of the Sergeant at Arms (the opposite end of the chamber from the Speaker's chair) and has no access beyond the bar of the house, which marks the area of the chamber where only MPs are allowed and visitors may not enter during sessions. The House of Commons Commission have stated that the Remembrancer does not have any access to the floor of the House of Commons.

Access to the under-gallery does not give any ability to participate in or influence the proceedings, and the Remembrancer has no access to sit in this area by right, but rather by permission of the Speaker extended to parliamentary agents.

The Corporation in general, and the Remembrancer in particular, have no power to overrule Parliament, which has the right to make legislation affecting the City. For example, the Corporation needed to request a private Act of Parliament in 2002 to modernise its system of local elections; the Act notes, "The objects of this Act cannot be attained without the authority of Parliament".

The Remembrancer does not have any entitlement to see parliamentary bills or other papers before they are publicly available, or to amend laws. The Remembrancer's responsibilities include monitoring legislation introduced into Parliament, and reporting to the Corporation anything that is likely to influence the City of London's interests. The Remembrancer also offers briefings to MPs and submits evidence when select committees are investigating matters of interest to the corporation, but does not have any special rights or privileges in this regard, having the same access as that of any other individual or body. The Remembrancer does not have any privileged access to view legislation during the drafting process, and is not even notified of public bills that impact the City, but is notified of the introduction of private bills that impact the City.

Despite statements to the contrary by the parliamentary and City authorities, beliefs persist that the Remembrancer has special access to or authority over the Commons, for example that they sit behind or near the Speaker, that the Remembrancer can access the floor of the Commons, that the Remembrancer can intervene in proceedings, or that the Remembrancer has special privileges to view draft legislation. For example, in an article in The Guardian in 2011 about the unreformed nature of the City of London Corporation, George Monbiot wrote:
 

In a further example, in 2013 Green Party MP Caroline Lucas wrote to the Speaker of the House of Commons, John Bercow, asking him to consider removing the Remembrancer from the floor of the House of Commons, and to end privileges she claimed the Remembrancer had to view legislation during the drafting process.

List of city remembrancers

See also
Remembrancer
King's Remembrancer

Footnotes

References

City of London
Government occupations
House of Commons of the United Kingdom
Politics of the City of London